The Herluf Trolle class was a class of coastal defence ships of the Royal Danish Navy.

Design

Dimensions and machinery

Armour

Armament
The main armament of the ships were two  single gun turrets. Secondary armament included four single  guns and ten  single guns.

Construction
Herluf Trolle was laid down at the Copenhagen Navy Yard and launched on 1 January 1899. Olfert Fischer was also laid down at Copenhagen Navy Yard and was launched on 1 January 1902.

References
 Moore, J: Jane's Fighting Ships of World War I (1919; reprinted 1992)

External links
Description of class

Coastal defence ships of the Royal Danish Navy
Coastal defense ship classes
World War II coastal defence ships